First (The Sound of Music) is the debut album by English rock band Then Jerico, released in 1987. The album includes four singles which reached the UK Singles Chart: "Muscle Deep" (No. 85, re-release No. 48), "Let Her Fall" (No. 65), "Prairie Rose" (No. 89), and "The Motive" (No. 18). The album reached No. 35 on the UK Albums Chart.

Track listing
All tracks written by Then Jerico, except where noted.
"Let Her Fall"
"Blessed Days"
"Laughter Party"
"Stable Boy"
"The Motive" 
"Muscle Deep"
"A Quiet Place (Apathy and Sympathy)"
"Play Dead"
"The Hitcher"
"Prairie Rose" (Bryan Ferry, Phil Manzanera)
"Blessed Days (The Tokyo Mix)"
"Fault (Dub)" (produced by Martin Rushent)

References

External links
First (The Sound of Music) at Discogs

1987 debut albums
Then Jerico albums
London Records albums
MCA Records albums